The following highways are numbered 92:

International
 European route E92

Canada
 Newfoundland and Labrador Route 92

China 
  G92 Expressway

Iceland
Route 92

Iran
 Road 92

Israel
 Highway 92 (Israel)

Korea, South
National Route 92

Poland 
  National road 92

United States
 Interstate 92 (New England) (proposed)
 Interstate 92 (Michigan) (former proposal)
 U.S. Route 92
 Alabama State Route 92
 Arizona State Route 92
 Arkansas Highway 92
 California State Route 92
 Colorado State Highway 92
 Delaware Route 92
 Florida State Road 92
 County Road 92 (Collier County, Florida)
 Georgia State Route 92
 Hawaii Route 92
 Illinois Route 92
 Iowa Highway 92
 K-92 (Kansas highway)
 Kentucky Route 92
 Louisiana Highway 92
 Louisiana State Route 92 (former)
 Maine State Route 92
 Maryland Route 92 (former)
 M-92 (Michigan highway) (former)
 Minnesota State Highway 92
 Missouri Route 92
 Nebraska Highway 92
 Nebraska Recreation Road 92A
 Nevada State Route 92 (former)
 New Jersey Route 92 (former)
 County Route 92 (Bergen County, New Jersey)
 New Mexico State Road 92
 New York State Route 92
 County Route 92 (Dutchess County, New York)
 County Route 92 (Herkimer County, New York)
 County Route 92 (Jefferson County, New York)
 County Route 92 (Monroe County, New York)
 County Route 92 (Niagara County, New York)
 County Route 92 (Oneida County, New York)
 County Route 92 (Onondaga County, New York)
 County Route 92 (Orange County, New York)
 County Route 92 (Saratoga County, New York)
 County Route 92 (Steuben County, New York)
 County Route 92 (Suffolk County, New York)
 North Carolina Highway 92
 Ohio State Route 92 (former)
 Oklahoma State Highway 92
 Pennsylvania Route 92
 South Carolina Highway 92
 Tennessee State Route 92
 Texas State Highway 92
 Texas State Highway Spur 92
 Farm to Market Road 92
 Utah State Route 92
 Virginia State Route 92
 Washington State Route 92
 West Virginia Route 92
 Wisconsin Highway 92
 Wyoming Highway 92

See also
A92